This is a list of all FIS Alpine Ski World Cup hosts from 1967 to present.

Locations that have hosted World Cup competitions

References

External links

Host
World Cup host